Lum's Mill House, also known as the Clement House, Samuel Davies House, and Lum House, is a historic home located at Lums Pond State Park, Kirkwood, New Castle County, Delaware. It was built about 1713, and is a two-story, three-bay brick house.  An original one-story, three bay, extension was raised to two stories about 1809.  It is believed to have been the home of Samuel Davies.

It was added to the National Register of Historic Places in 1973.

References

Houses on the National Register of Historic Places in Delaware
Houses completed in 1713
Houses in New Castle County, Delaware
National Register of Historic Places in New Castle County, Delaware
1713 establishments in Delaware